Jacob Garrard (1 January 1846 – 5 November 1931) was a politician in colonial New South Wales, serving as Secretary for Public Works and Minister of Public Instruction.

Early life
Garrard was born in Harwich, Essex, England, the son of Joseph Garrard, a revenue officer, and his wife Martha, née Piggott. Educated at Harwich National School and Southwark Borough School, Garrard migrated at 13 years of age with his family to New Zealand where he worked on coastal ships. Garrard moved in 1867 to Sydney, New South Wales and lived at Balmain and until around 1883.

Political career
Garrard represented Balmain in the New South Wales Legislative Assembly from 19 November 1880 to 6 June 1891, and was returned at the head of the poll at the general election in 1889. He was defeated at the 1891 election for Balmain with  picking up all 4 seats. He returned to the Legislative Assembly as one of the members for Central Cumberland at the by-election on 29 August 1891 following the death of Robert Ritchie, serving until 25 June 1894 when multi-member districts were abolished. 76 new districts were created, and Garrard successfully contested Sherbrooke which largely consisted of the north western part of Central Cumberland, including Blacktown and Baulkham Hills. He held the seat in 1895 but was defeated at the 1898 election.

He was Secretary for Public Works in the last Robertson Ministry from December 1885 to February 1886. He was Minister of Public Instruction in the Reid ministry from 3 August 1894 until 15 August 1898, adding the additional portfolio of Minister for Labour and Industry from 11 March 1895.

Later life and death
He was appointed to the Metropolitan Board of Water Supply and Sewerage in 1899, serving until 1912, including a period as president from 1899 until 1904.

Garrard died in Hornsby, Sydney, Australia on 5 November 1931, survived by two daughters and two of his five sons. He was buried in the Methodist section of Gore Hill cemetery.

References

 

1846 births
1931 deaths
Free Trade Party politicians
Members of the New South Wales Legislative Assembly
People from Harwich
English emigrants to Australia
Mayors of Balmain
Burials at Gore Hill Cemetery
Sydney Water